Ge'alya, sometimes written Galia, is a moshav in central Israel. Located in the coastal plain and covering 2,000 dunams, it falls under the jurisdiction of Gan Raveh Regional Council.

History
The moshav was founded in 1948 by immigrants from Bulgaria, on land belonging to the Palestinian village of Qubayba, which was depopulated in 1948.

It is located south of the ancient site of Tel Shalaf, where Iron Age artifacts have been found. Tel Shalaf,  is identified by some but not all scholars with the city of Eltekeh. Eltekeh appeared in Sennacherib's Annals as the site of a battle between the Assyrians and Egyptians in 701 BCE, and in the Bible as a Levitical city within the first Dan tribal area ( and ).

References

External links
Official website 

Bulgarian-Jewish culture in Israel
Moshavim
Populated places established in 1948
Populated places in Central District (Israel)
1948 establishments in Israel